Cathedral High School is an American all-girls', private, Roman Catholic high school in the borough of Manhattan in New York City, New York.

It is located within the Roman Catholic Archdiocese of New York.

Establishment and location
The school was established in 1905 by the Sisters of Charity.

It moved to its current location in 1973.

Admissions and curriculum
Enrollment is open to young women of all cultures and faiths.

There are plenty of college preparatory courses as well as Advanced Placement classes, including  biology, calculus, English, history, literature, physics, and Spanish.

A course on religion is mandatory on an annual basis; however, the school accepts girls of all faiths.

Notable alumni

 Lynda Baquero (born 1967) – television news journalist with local station WNBC
 Ursula Burns (born 1958) –  president and CEO of Xerox
 Eileen Egan (1912–2000) – journalist and peace activist
 Ninfa Segarra (born 1950) –  last president of the New York City Board of Education

References

External links
 School website

Roman Catholic secondary schools in Manhattan
Educational institutions established in 1905
Girls' schools in New York City
Private high schools in Manhattan
1905 establishments in New York City